is a Japanese police comedy-drama television series originally broadcast by the Fuji Television group in 1997. The series was developed by Ryoichi Kimizuka and stars Oda Yūji, Toshirō Yanagiba, Eri Fukatsu, Chosuke Ikariya, Miki Mizuno, and Yūsuke Santamaria. In 1998 and 1999, an English-subtitled version of the series was broadcast in the United States on the International Channel, under the title The Spirited Criminal Investigative Network.

The series spawned three television films and a stage play, along with six theatrically released films that were produced following the end of the show. The first of the theatrical films, Bayside Shakedown, was released in 1998, and the sixth and final film, Bayside Shakedown The Final, was released in 2012. The first Bayside Shakedown film was a major box office hit in Japan, earning 10.1 billion yen (84 million U.S. dollars), and was the third highest grossing live-action film in Japanese box office history. The second film in the series, Bayside Shakedown 2, earned over $165 million at the box office, making it the highest-grossing live-action Japanese film on domestic screens.

Story summary
Bayside Shakedown takes place in the fictional Wangan Precinct of the Tokyo Metropolitan Police Department. Unlike most police dramas which tend to focus on action and car chases, Bayside Shakedown is largely concerned with the bureaucratic issues of the police department that are very present in many other sectors of Japanese society. The series depicted police work as office politics under a slightly different environment, complete with bureaucratic red tape, lethargic civil servants, bosses more interested in playing golf and saving face than solving crimes, interference from politicians, and conflict between police headquarters and the local officers.

The officers depicted in Bayside Shakedown are only permitted to carry firearms during major emergencies. Fuji TV used the fictional "All officers are to be armed" (拳銃携帯命令 Kenjū Keitai Meirei) order, which the portrayed bureaucracy is often reluctant to hand down. (In reality, it is compulsory for a uniformed officer to be armed, and plainclothes officers are required to be armed if they expect to be exposed to any danger.)

The main character of the series is a young detective named Shunsaku Aoshima (played by Oda Yūji). Originally a corporate salesman, Aoshima decided to join the police department out of heroic idealism, expecting a life of adventure and excitement. Once inside, he is completely underwhelmed by the reality of police work, finding it dishearteningly similar to corporate employment. Throughout the series, he strives against the obstacles of bureaucratic indifference to help people and pursue his ideals of what a police officer should be, often with humorous results.

Cast
Oda Yūji as Shunsaku Aoshima
Toshirō Yanagiba as Shinji Muroi
Eri Fukatsu as Sumire Onda
Chosuke Ikariya as Heihachirō Waku
Miki Mizuno as Yukino Kashiwagi
Yūsuke Santamaria as Masayoshi Mashita
Sōichirō Kitamura as Sōichirō Kanda
Satoru Saitō as Harumi Akiyama
Takehiko Ono as Kengo Hakamada
Kenta Satoi as Jirō Uozumi
Akira Hamada as Shimazu
Shigemitsu Ogi as Masakazu Ichikura
Yuki Uchida as Natsumi Shinohara

Guests
Yoshimasa Kondo as Fumio Tanaka (episode 1)
Toshihito Ito as Yamabe (episode 2)
Ryoko Shinohara (episode 2)
Katsuhiko Sasaki (episode 2)
Asami Mizukawa as a middle school student (episode 3)
Kee  (episode 4)
Hikaru Ijūin (episode 5)
Tomoe Shinohara as Herself (episode 6)
Claude Maki as Tatsumura (episodes 6 and 7)
Yoshihiko Hakamada (episode 8)
Sadao Abe (episode 9)
Naoki Hosaka (pisodes 10 and the final)
Maxi Priest (pisodes 10 and the final)
Hiroshi Arikawa as the father of Masayoshi Mashita (the final episode)

Timeline
1997 January–March: TV Drama.

1997 December: Special episode, Bayside Shakedown: Year-End Special Alert

1998 June: Extra episode, Bayside Shakedown: Wangan Police Station Female Police Officers' Story.

1998 October: Special episode, Bayside Shakedown: Autumn Campaign for Crime Eradication

1998 October: Bayside Shakedown: The Movie

2003 Summer: Bayside Shakedown 2.

2005 Summer: Two "spin-off" movies which are part of The Odoru Legend Continues. The first titled Tokyo Subway Panic (also known as Negotiator) was released in May. It is based on the character of Mashita as a police negotiator. The second movie The Suspect which was released in August is based on the character of Muroi. Another spin-off, Tobosha Joichiro Kijima was recorded for the DVD release of the Tokyo Subway Panic.

2007: For a Japanese variety show, Trivia no Izumi, a new spin-off was made for a minor character from Tokyo Subway Panic (who did not even have a name at the time), titled Keigokan Uchida Shinzo.

2010 Summer: Bayside Shakedown 3.

2012 September: The last TV special, Bayside Shakedown THE LAST TV Salaryman keiji to saigo no nanjiken. Some of the original cast members reunite after 14 years.

2012 September: The last movie for Bayside Shakedown which is Bayside Shakedown The Final.

References

External links
Official site of the two spin-off movies

1997 Japanese television series debuts
1997 Japanese television series endings
Japanese police procedural television series
Japanese comedy television series
Tokyo Metropolitan Police Department in fiction
Japanese detective television drama series